God of Bath is a South Korean manhwa series written and illustrated by Ha Il-kwon. Started on July 14, 2011, this webtoon manhwa was released on Naver Webtoon. The print release of the first volume of God of Bath was released on May 8, 2012. The webtoon was to be adapted into a feature film in 2014, though the film never premiered.

References

External links
 God of Bath official website on Naver 

Manhwa titles
2011 webtoon debuts
Naver Comics titles
South Korean webtoons
Comedy-drama comics
2010s webtoons
Webtoons in print
Comedy webtoons
Drama webtoons